The 1961–62 Bulgarian Cup was the 22nd season of the Bulgarian Cup (in this period the tournament was named Cup of the Soviet Army). Botev Plovdiv won the competition, beating Dunav Ruse 3–0 in the final at the Vasil Levski National Stadium.

First round

|}

Second round

|}

Quarter-finals

|}

Semi-finals

|}

Final

Details

References

1961-62
1961–62 domestic association football cups
Cup